Derartu Tulu NL COL (Amharic: ደራርቱ ቱሉ; born 21 March 1972) is an Ethiopian former long-distance runner, who competed in track, cross country running, and road running up to the marathon distance. She won 10,000 metres titles at the 1992 Barcelona and 2000 Sydney Olympics, and a bronze in the event at the 2004 Athens Olympics. At the World Championships in Athletics, Derartu took silver in the 10,000 m in 1995, and a gold in 2001. She was a three-time IAAF World Cross Country champion (1995, 1997, 2000).

She currently serves as President of Ethiopian Athletics Federation since 2018.

Derartu comes from a sporting family of several Olympic medalists, which includes her cousins Tirunesh, Genzebe and Ejegayehu Dibaba.

Life and career
Derartu Tulu grew up tending cattle in the village of Bekoji in the highlands of Arsi Province, the same village as Kenenisa Bekele. She is the cousin of Ejegayehu Dibaba, Tirunesh Dibaba and Genzebe Dibaba.

Derartu is the first Ethiopian woman and the first African woman to win an Olympic gold medal, which she won in the 10,000 m event at the 1992 Barcelona Olympic Games. The race, where she and Elana Meyer (South Africa) raced for lap after lap way ahead of the rest of the field, launched her career. She sat out 1993 and 1994 with a knee injury and returned to competition in the 1995 IAAF World Cross Country Championships where she won gold, having arrived at the race only an hour before the start. She was stuck in Athens airport without sleep for 24 hours. The same year she lost out to Fernanda Ribeiro and won silver at the World Championships 10,000.

The 1996 season was a difficult year for her. At the IAAF World Cross Country Championships Derartu lost her shoe in the race and had to fight back to get fourth place. She also finished fourth at the Olympic Games, where she was nursing an injury. In 1997 she won the world cross country title for the second time, but did not factor in the 10,000 m World Championships. In 1998 she gave birth to a daughter, Tsion, but came back in 2000 in the best shape of her life. She won the 10,000 m Olympic gold for the second time (the only woman to have done this in the short history of the event). She also won the IAAF World Cross Country Championships title for the third time. In 2001, she finally won her world 10,000 track title in Edmonton. This was her third world or Olympic gold medal. She has a total of 5 world and Olympic medals.

Her transition to the marathon was rewarded with victories in London and Tokyo Marathons in 2001. She finished fourth at the 2005 World Championships, setting her personal best time of 2:23:30. She also won the Portugal Half Marathon in 2000 and 2003, and Lisbon Half Marathon in 2003. In 2009, at the age of 37, she won the New York City Marathon, defeating of the likes of Paula Radcliffe, Lyudmila Petrova and Salina Kosgei.

In 2004 Derartu declined to enter the New York Marathon, where she would have been likely to face marathon World Record holder Paula Radcliffe, whom she has had a great rivalry with over the years, and focused instead on the Olympic Games, where she won the bronze medal in the 10,000 m behind Xing Huina and her cousin Ejegayehu Dibaba. (Radcliffe failed to finish.)

Derartu continued to run competitively in her late thirties, while most of her old rivals retired. Her last marathon finish came in 2011 in Yokohama.

She is remembered for her speed and her 60.3 second-last lap at the end of the 10,000 m at the Sydney Olympics was a sprint of note.

She has been the president of the Ethiopian Athletics Federation (EAF) since 14 November 2018.

International competitions

Personal life
Tulu is the aunt of the Dibaba siblings – Ejegayehu, Tirunesh and Genzebe Dibaba.

Accolades
Tulu was named to the BBC's 100 Women programme in 2017.

References

External links

Derartu Tulu at International Olympic Committee

1972 births
Living people
Sportspeople from Oromia Region
Ethiopian female long-distance runners
Ethiopian female marathon runners
Olympic athletes of Ethiopia
Olympic gold medalists for Ethiopia
Olympic bronze medalists for Ethiopia
Athletes (track and field) at the 1992 Summer Olympics
Athletes (track and field) at the 1996 Summer Olympics
Athletes (track and field) at the 2000 Summer Olympics
Athletes (track and field) at the 2004 Summer Olympics
Medalists at the 1992 Summer Olympics
Medalists at the 2000 Summer Olympics
Medalists at the 2004 Summer Olympics
World Athletics Championships athletes for Ethiopia
World Athletics Championships medalists
World Athletics Cross Country Championships winners
New York City Marathon female winners
London Marathon female winners
Olympic gold medalists in athletics (track and field)
Olympic bronze medalists in athletics (track and field)
African Games gold medalists for Ethiopia
African Games medalists in athletics (track and field)
Goodwill Games medalists in athletics
Athletes (track and field) at the 1991 All-Africa Games
BBC 100 Women
World Athletics Championships winners
Competitors at the 2001 Goodwill Games
Goodwill Games gold medalists in athletics